The Third Street Motor Car Company Building, at 216 E. Third St. in Newport, Kentucky, was built in 1916. It was listed on the National Register of Historic Places in 2002.

It was deemed notable as "one of northern Kentucky's finest examples of this increasingly rare building type. It is characteristic in form and detailing, retaining many original features. Its tapestry brickwork and geometrical detailing, influenced by the Craftsman style, set it apart from other area examples. It has been evaluated within the context of "Automobile Showrooms of Northern Kentucky, c. 1910-1945."

See also 
 Universal Car Company: NRHP listing in Louisville, Kentucky
 National Register of Historic Places listings in Campbell County, Kentucky

References

National Register of Historic Places in Campbell County, Kentucky
Commercial buildings completed in 1916
Newport, Kentucky
Auto dealerships on the National Register of Historic Places
Transportation in Campbell County, Kentucky
1916 establishments in Kentucky
American Craftsman architecture in Kentucky